Simpson Newland CMG (2 November 1835 – 27 June 1925), pastoralist, author and politician, was a pioneer in Australia who made significant contributions to development around the Murray River. He was also an author of practical works and novels.

Early years
Newland was born in Hanley, Staffordshire, a son of Rev. Ridgway William Newland (died 1864) and his wife Martha Newland, née Keeling (died 1870), who emigrated with their eight children to South Australia aboard the Sir Charles Forbes, arriving in June 1839. 
He and his siblings were educated to a high standard at home by their mother.
Simpson Newland was at first a sickly boy, but the open air life improved his health, and he became a competent stockrider and bushman. His evenings were largely given up to improving his education with the help of his mother.

Pastoralist and prosperity
In 1864 Newland took up station life on the Darling River in New South Wales some 50 miles from Wilcannia, and became more and more interested in the indigenous people and the natural history of the country. He improved the breeds of his sheep and cattle, and by age 40 had become very prosperous. On 12 September 1872 at Buckanbee, New South Wales, he married Jane Isabella Layton.

Undelcarra
In 1876, with three sons, they moved to Adelaide and bought a mansion at Burnside which they called "Undelcarra"; Newland continued to manage the stations from Adelaide. George Debney was a leading furniture maker in Rundle Street and one of the first owners of the estate that was later known as Undelcarra.  The estate stretched north from Second Creek, between Lockwood Road and Hallett Road up to approximately where Statenborough Street is now located.  The Debneys lived on the property from the 1850s till 1877 when it was sold to Simpson Newland who significantly enlarged the house and called it Undelcarra.

Undelcarra belonged to Simpson Newland between 1876 and 1911. He is best known as author of the book Paving the Way, but was also a pastoralist from the River Darling area where his Marra Station had an out-station named Undelcarra which is said to be Aboriginal for 'under the hill with running water'. The estate passed into the hands of Torrens Ward, solicitor from 1911–1919. It was purchased in 1919 by Alfred Allen Simpson of A. Simpson & Co whitegoods manufacturers. The final subdivision was in 1969, but the house still stands in Undelcarra Road and is still owned by his descendants. The gatehouse, which is still on Lockwood Road near the bridge over Second Creek, was converted into a private residence and the main driveway re-routed to have access from Undelcarra Road. The gates that are now seen there were originally on Glynburn Road at the end of the driveway to the house Erindale.

Politics and public life

He entered the House of Assembly in 1881 as member for Encounter Bay, and soon afterwards brought in a measure to build a north to south railway on the land grant system which was defeated.

In June 1885 he became Treasurer of South Australia in the Downer ministry but, finding the strain of his duties too much for his health, resigned the position a year later.

He took much interest in the development of the River Murray and revived the question of the north–south railway. He succeeded in getting a royal commission appointed to consider it, and as chairman of the commission personally examined the country as far north as Alice Springs. In two pamphlets, The Far North Country (1887) and Our Waste Lands (1888), Newland gave an account of his journey and his views on the possibilities of the districts traversed. In 1889 he visited England and while there heard of the discovery of rich ore at Broken Hill. He had acquired an interest in the new field and this now became very valuable.

Author
On his return, encouraged by his friend Sir John Langdon Bonython, for whose paper (The Advertiser) he had written a number of articles, he wrote his novel, Paving the Way, which embodied many of his experiences as a pioneer and with indigenous people.

He went to England again in 1893 and arranged for the publication of his book. It was released the same year and was given a good reception by the critics. A second edition was published in 1894 and it has since been several times reprinted. Newland also published a second novel, Blood Tracks of the Bush, in 1900, which was less successful than his earlier work, "partly because inferior, but also because he courageously and accurately portrayed horrific mass-murders of Aborigines by police and pastoralists. The public was not ready for such honesty."

In 1895 he produced several articles for the Adelaide Observer as part of that newspaper's "Old-time Memories" series: Some Aboriginals I have known, and A band of pioneers.

North–South railway line
On Newland's return to Adelaide at the end of 1893, he began collecting material for a pamphlet on the Northern Territory, and the necessity for its being linked to the south by a railway.

In 1899 he visited England and obtained the promise of support from financial interests in London, and returning to Australia obtained parliamentary sanction for the construction of a railway on the land grant system in 1902. His pamphlet, Land-Grant Railway across Australia: The Northern Territory of the State of South Australia as a Field for Enterprise and Capital, was published by the government at the end of that year. In 1906 he again went to England and succeeded in floating a company to undertake the building of the line. On his return he found that a Labor government under Thomas Price had come into power, and as the policy of Labor was opposed to building lines on the land grant system, Newland realized that nothing could be done at the time.

Other interests

He resumed his work on the development of a river port on the Murray, he had become a vice-president of the River Murray league in 1902, and the question was kept alive in 1903 and 1904 by holding public meetings. On 28 July 1904 Newland was elected president of the league, and the necessity of developing the Murray was kept steadily before the public for many years. A great step forward was made in 1914, when the Prime Minister of Australia, Sir Joseph Cook, pledged £1,000,000 from the Commonwealth if each of the three states interested would spend a similar amount, which is what occurred.

Newland had many interests. In 1895–1900 and again in 1920–22 he was president of the South Australian branch of the Royal Geographical Society of Australasia, and in 1906–23 president of the South Australian Zoological and Acclimatization Society. He deplored the European destruction of the environment and proposed that the Coorong area should be reserved for Aborigines and the land reforested. In 1922 he was appointed C.M.G. (Companion of the Order of St Michael and St George).
He had published a pamphlet in middle life, A Band of Pioneers, Old-Time Memories (2nd ed. 1919), which included an interesting account of the arrival of his family in 1839. This was incorporated in his Memoirs of Simpson Newland, written in the last year of his long life. It was completed on 6 June 1925 and showed him to be still in full command of his mental powers. He died three weeks later, but before he died he knew that it had definitely been decided to complete the north to south railway line; his other dream of a (sea-)port at the mouth of the Murray still awaits fulfilment.

Family

Newland died on 27 June 1925 at North Adelaide, survived by his wife and three of their five sons. His ashes were taken to his spiritual home, Victor Harbor, for burial.

Colonel Sir Henry Simpson Newland DSO, CBE (1873–1969), their eldest son, was an accomplished surgeon known for his public works and as a founder of the Royal Australasian College of Surgeons.

Philip Mesmer Newland (1875–1916) was an Australian sportsman who excelled at Australian rules football, cricket and lacrosse. He played Sheffield Shield cricket for South Australia as a wicket-keeper and toured England with the Australian Test team in 1905. He played Australian rules football with the Norwood Football Club and captained Norwood's 1904 premiership winning team.

Major Victor Marra Newland MC, OBE (1876–1953), their third son, had a distinguished military career, was a successful business man, a member of the stock exchange, and in the period 1933–38 represented North Adelaide for the Liberal and Country League in the House of Assembly.

Doctor Clive Newland (1878–1919), a graduate of London University, had a practice at Morphett Vale. He was killed in a railway accident, when the motorcycle he was riding collided with an oncoming train.

Ralph Dimmock Newland (1880–1933), their youngest son, represented South Australia at lacrosse.

Bibliography

Novels

 Paving the Way: A Romance of the Australian Bush (1893)
 Blood Tracks of the Bush: An Australian Romance (1900)

Autobiography

 The Far North Country (1887)
 Old Time Memories: a band of pioneers (1895)
 Memoirs of Simpson Newland, C.M.G. Sometime Treasurer of South Australia (1926)

See also
Electoral district of Newland

References

1835 births
1925 deaths
19th-century Australian novelists
Australian male novelists
Australian non-fiction writers
Companions of the Order of St Michael and St George
People from Hanley, Staffordshire
Politicians from Adelaide
Writers from Adelaide
Treasurers of South Australia
Members of the South Australian House of Assembly
19th-century male writers
Male non-fiction writers